Kadykchan is a depopulated urban locality (a work settlement) in Susumansky District of Magadan Oblast, Russia. As of the 2010 Census, it had no recorded population.

Etymology
The settlement's name comes from the indigenous Even language word meaning "small gorge" or "ravine".

History
Kadykchan was built by gulag prisoners during World War II for the purposes of coal extraction. Later it accommodated miners at two local coal mines which supplied Arkagalinskaya electric power station.

After the dissolution of the Soviet Union, coal mining in the area became increasingly unprofitable. One mine closed in 1992, and an explosion at the other in 1996 which killed six people led to a decision to close it also and for the government to subsidize residents to move elsewhere. Major buildings were blown up. As of 2010, the settlement was officially completely depopulated.

Population history

External links
Unofficial website of Kadykchan 
Pictures of Kadykchan
The Town that Disappeared (BBC News)

References

Notes

Sources

Urban-type settlements in Magadan Oblast
Defunct towns in Russia